"Scream (Funk My Life Up)" is a song by British pop/rock singer Paolo Nutini. The song was released as the lead single from his third studio album, Caustic Love. It was released in the United Kingdom on 28 January 2014 as a digital download, through Warner Music Group. The song peaked at number 12 on the UK Singles Chart and number 5 in Scotland. The song has also charted in Belgium, New Zealand and Switzerland.

Music video
A music video to accompany the release of "Scream (Funk My Life Up)" was first released onto YouTube on 10 March 2014 at a total length of three minutes and nineteen seconds. The video was directed by Nez.

Track listing

Charts

Certifications

Release history

References

2014 singles
Paolo Nutini songs
Songs written by Paolo Nutini
2013 songs
Atlantic Records UK singles